Paraleptoneta is a genus of leptonetids that was first described by L. Fage in 1913.  it contains only two species: P. bellesi and P. spinimana.

See also
 List of Leptonetidae species

References

Araneomorphae genera
Leptonetidae
Spiders of Africa